Marie Holzman (born 4 January 1952) is a French sinologist, university professor of Chinese, writer, journalist and translator. Her research focuses on contemporary China and Chinese dissidents.

Biography
Holzman was born  in Paris. Between 1972 and 1980, she stayed in Asia in Taiwan, the People's Republic of China and Japan. She was a student in Beijing when the first Beijing Spring broke out in 1978. Since then, she has supported the victims of repression in China.

Holzman is professor of Chinese, a teaching assistant at Paris Diderot University and was the director of the Chinese section of the DESS-NCI programme of the University of Sorbonne Nouvelle Paris 3 from 1984 to 2002.

She is the chairwoman of the association Solidarité Chine ("Solidarity China") that was established in 1989 after the Tiananmen Square protests. She is also a board member of Human Rights in China (HRIC), a member of the Asia-Democracy Forum and a spokeswoman of the Collectif Pékin J.O. 2008. Her aim is to "echo the voice of those who take on pro-democracy stands, so that the West understands that the Chinese are not all fascinated by business and artwork counterfeiting."

Holzman published documented works about prominent figures of the Chinese democracy movement, including  Wei Jingsheng, Lin Xiling, Ding Zilin, Hu Ping and Liu Qing. She gave lectures about contemporary China at the Bank of France, the National Institute for Oriental Languages and Civilizations (INALCO) and the Paris Foreign Missions Society.

She regularly writes for the French political magazine Politique internationale.

Holzman created the publishing series Les Moutons Noirs (lit. 'The Black Sheep') algonside Jean-François Bouthors and Galia Ackerman, with the support of Pierre Bergé.

On 31 December 2008 Holzman was named a Knight of the Legion of Honour. She was awarded the decoration by Pierre Bergé (who, at the time, was in a conflict with Beijing about the selling of two bronze pieces of the Old Summer Palace) on 2 June 2009, the day before the 20th anniversary of the Tian'anmen massacre, on behalf of President Nicolas Sarkozy.

Holzman's works are notably influenced by Vladimir Bukovsky.

Actions about Tibet
In 2008, Holzman became the spokeswoman of the Collectif Jeux Olympiques 2008. She called for sportspeople and foreign officials to boycott the 2008 Summer Olympics opening ceremony as long as the Chinese leaders do not change their mind on the repression and the imprisonment of Tibetan opponents.

Works 
Avec les Chinois, Flammarion, 1981, 
Pékin et ses environs, with Danièle Crisà and René Giudicelli, Arthaud, 1986, 1992,  
Chinois de Paris, Seghers, 1989 
Chine, Arthaud, 1992,   
Comment Lü Dongbin devint immortel, with Chao-Pao Chen, Gallimard, 1995, 
Chine, on ne bâillonne pas la lumière with Noël Mamère, Ramsay, 1997 
Lin Xiling l’indomptable, Bayard éditions/Centurion, 1998,  
L'empire des Bas-fonds, by writer Liao Yiwu, translation, Bleu de Chine, 2003,  
Écrits édifiants et curieux sur la Chine du XXIe with Chen Yan, Editions de l’Aube, 2004, original language: Chinese,  
 La pensée manipulée, Le cas chinois, Hu Ping, Editions de l’Aube, 2004, translation,  
Wei Jingsheng, un chinois inflexible, with Bernard Debord, Bleu de Chine, 6 avril 2005,  
 Chine, à quand la démocratie ? : Les illusions de la modernisation with Hu Ping, 2005,  (2007)
 Pourquoi il faut boycotter la cérémonie d'ouverture des JO de Pékin with RSF and Marc Raimbourg, Le Cherche Midi, 2008,  
 L'Envers des médailles : JO de Pékin 2008, Bleu de Chine, 2008, 
 Quand la terre s'est ouverte au Sichuan : Journal d'une tragédie by Liao Yiwu, translation with Marc Raimbourg, 2010, Buchet-Chastel, 
 Dans l’empire des ténèbres, by Liao Yiwu, with Marc Raimbourg and Gao Yun, series Les moutons noirs, Books, 2014,

Prefaces 
 Liao Yiwu, Dieu est rouge, translated by Hervé Denès, series Les moutons noirs, Bourin, 2015,  
 Gyaltsen Drölkar, L'insoumise de Lhassa, douze ans dans les prisons chinoises au Tibet, series Les moutons noirs, Bourin, 2011, 
 Cai Chongguo, J'étais à Tien An Men, Esprit Du Temps, 2009, 
 Les Massacres de la Révolution culturelle, texts collected by Song Yongyi, translated by Marc Raimbourg, 2008, Buchet-Chastel,

References

External links

Marie Holzman about Wei Jingsheng in the TV programme Bouillon de culture, INA archive. 

20th-century French women writers
21st-century French women writers
French sinologists
Historians of China
20th-century French historians
21st-century French historians
French women historians
20th-century French journalists
21st-century French journalists
French women journalists
French translators
Chinese–French translators
Chevaliers of the Légion d'honneur
Writers from Paris
1952 births
Living people